De Volharding is a smock mill in Jislum, Friesland, Netherlands which was built in 1872. The mill has been restored to working order and designated as being held in reserve in times of emergency. It is listed as a Rijksmonument, number 15632.

History

De Volharding was built in 1872. The mill can pump water into the polder as well as draining water from the polder. The mill worked until 1955, after which it became derelict. On 28 December 1971, it was the first mill bought by Stichting De Fryske Mole. The mill was restored by millwright Tacoma of Stiens in 1973. A further restoration was undertaken in 1994. In 2000, a new Archimedes' screw was fitted by millwright H Kloosterman. In 2006, the mill was officially designated by Wetterskap Fryslân as being held in reserve for use in times of emergency.

Description

De Volharding is what the Dutch describe as an grondzeiler. It is a two-storey smock mill on a low brick base. There is no stage, the sails reaching almost to the ground. The mill is winded by tailpole and winch. The smock and cap arecovered in vertical boards. The sails are Common sails. The sails are carried on a wooden windshaft. The windshaft also carries the brake wheel which has 32 cogs. This drives the wallower (17 cogs) at  the top of the upright shaft. At the bottom of the upright shaft, the crown wheel, which has 28 cogs drives a gearwheel with 25 cogs on the axle of the Archimedes' screw. The axle of the Archimedes' screw is  diameter. It is inclined at 19°. Each revolution of the screw lifts  of water.

Public access
De Volharding is open by appointment.

References

Windmills in Friesland
Windmills completed in 1872
Smock mills in the Netherlands
Windpumps in the Netherlands
Rijksmonuments in Friesland
Octagonal buildings in the Netherlands